Nicky Hamlyn is a British filmmaker, artist and published author working in Structural film. He has been making films for three decades. His work explores the basic elements of the filmic experience: the relationship between film space and the film frame, between time, flicker and movement, and between light and the material image. He has contributed to Film Quarterly and has published Film Art Phenomena and Kurt Kren: Structuralist Films with Simon Payn and A.L. Rees. He was workshop organizer for the London Film-Makers' Co-op in the late 1970s.

Hamlyn graduated in fine art from the University of Reading in 1976 and is currently a professor of Experimental Film and Video at the University for the Creative Arts in Canterbury, and Lecturer in Visual Communication MA at the Royal College of Art in London. Hamlyn specialises in experimental film  and video arts and visual theory.

Screenings
Hamlyn exhibited films with a colleague, the film director and writer Andrew Kotting in 2008 at The George Rodger Gallery in Maidstone, Kent.

Screenings of his work have taken place at the Royal College of Art, London (2006) and the New York and Toronto International Film Festivals (2007).

He has had one-person shows at San Francisco Cinematheque, Pacific Film Archive, Berkeley and Double Negative, Montreal (2007).

In November 2009, Hamlyn exhibited films in Unit B9, The Powerhub. This is a former commercial vehicles factory, situated by the river Medway in Maidstone and viewable from Maidstone East railway station. He exhibited in conjunction with a number of emerging artists including the photographer artist, Sebastian Edge. The work was entitled 5-9, intended to exploit the dusk to night time light of the semi-industrial urban landscape on this part of the river. All the work was designed to be projected onto the windows of the gallery, and could be viewed from the railway footbridge opposite, as well as from inside the building.

In his most recent work, produced on an artist's residency in Toronto, Hamlyn has been concerned with exploring and trying to refine the relationship between the camera and its profilmic. All the films are silent and have been made frame by frame, in the manner of animation, and include rural and urban landscapes and domestic interiors.

References

External links 
 Professor Nicky Hamlyn, University for the Creative Arts Staff Profile

British film directors
Living people
Alumni of the University of Reading
Place of birth missing (living people)
Year of birth missing (living people)